Girish Oak (born 17 August 1960) is a Marathi, editor, film actor, play actor and poetry writer. His play U Turn has become very popular. From 22 July 2019, he played a lead role in the Marathi serial Aggabai Sasubai on Zee Marathi and from 15 March 2021, he is playing a lead role in Aggabai Sunbai on Zee Marathi.

Career
Oak was born in Nagpur. He completed his degree in Bachelor of Ayurveda, Medicine and Surgery. Girish Oak became a full-time actor because of his love for theatre. He was very active at the college level, he took part in the state plays competitions as well as intercollegiate ones. He started career acting in play from  the year 1984. Oak has acted in many TV serials, plays and films. He also has acted his around 40+ plays and the same number of films. He has played comedy, serious or dramatic, he can portray the role effortlessly.

Television
 Phulala Sugandha Maticha
 Aggabai Sunbai
 Aggabai Sasubai
 Pasant Aahe Mulgi
 Julun Yeti Reshimgathi
 Fu Bai Fu
 Pinjara
 Man Udhan Varyache
 Boss Mazi Ladachi
 Eka Hatachi Tali
 Paus Mrugacha Padato
 Paramveer
 Bandini
 Manachiye Gunti
 Prabhakar
 Are Sansar Sansar
 Duheri
 Eka Shwasache Antar
 Damini
 Kimayagar
 Avantika
 Saheb Bibi Aani Mi
 Zale Unhache Chandane
 Wadal
 Nivdung
 Hya Gojirwanya Gharat
 Adhuri Ek Kahani
 Ya Sukhano Ya
 Chhoti Malkin
 Kukuchaku
 Agnihotra
 Puneri Misal
 Aaradhana
 Ahankar (Hindi)
 Daddy Samajha Karo (Hindi)
 Gruhdah (Hindi)

Films
 Cappuccino (2014)
 Taani (2013) 
 Khel Saat Baaracha (2010)
 Asa Mi Kay Gunha Kela (2010)

 Manatlya Manat (2009)
 Ticha Chukal Tari Kaay? (2009)
 Mi Amruta Boltey (2008)
 Baba Lagin (2007)
 Bhau Majha Pathi Rakha (2006)
 Maza Navara Tuzi Bayako (2006)
 Corporate (2006)
 Amhi Asu Ladke (2006)
 Zuluk (2005)
 Munnabhai S.S.C (2005)
 Saatchya Aat Gharat (2004)
 Tochi Ek Samarth (2004)
 Vishwavinayak (1994).
 Lavanyavati (1993)
 Paisa Paisa Paisa (1993)
 Shivrayachi Soon Tararani (1993).
 Wat Pahate Punvechi (1992)
 Jasa Baap Tashi Pora (1991)
 gol gol gara gara (2019)

Plays
 Deepstambh
 U turn
 Kusum Manohar Lele
 Kahani Main Twist
 Shree tashi Sau
 Shadyantra
 Love Birds
 Welcome Jindagi
 To mi navhech

Editor
 Astharoopa Jai Vaibhavlakshmi Maata (TV Movie) 2008

Personal
Girish oak is married to Pallavi Oak and they have a daughter Durga Oak.
Girija Oak is the daughter of Marathi actor Girish Oak from First marriage.

References

External links
 Girish Oak at IMDb

Male actors in Marathi cinema
Living people
1960 births
Male actors in Marathi television